The bubon is a Ukrainian percussive folk instrument, of the tambourine family. Occasionally, and increasingly in more modern times (late 20th century) holes are made in the wooden sides into which metal (brass) rings are placed which rattle when the bubon is struck with the hand or a stick. The first mentions of the bubon date back to the 11th century. It was also a popular instrument among the Ukrainian Cossacks.

See also
 Ukrainian folk music

References
Samples and Pictures of Ukrainian Instruments
Humeniuk, A.  Ukrainski narodni muzychni instrumenty, Kyiv: Naukova dumka, 1967 
Mizynec, V.  Ukrainian Folk Instruments,  Melbourne: Bayda books, 1984 
Cherkaskyi, L.  Ukrainski narodni muzychni instrumenty,  Tekhnika, Kyiv, Ukraine, 2003 - 262 pages.  

Ukrainian musical instruments
Unpitched percussion instruments
Hand drums
Percussion instruments played with specialised beaters
European percussion instruments